Mordellistena gemellata is a beetle in the genus Mordellistena of the family Mordellidae. It was described in 1899 by Friedrich Julius Schilsky.

References

gemellata
Beetles described in 1899